Indonesia national under-20 football team represents Indonesia at international association football tournaments such as the AFC U-20 Asian Cup, FIFA U-20 World Cup, and any under-19 tournaments.

Coaches

Coaching staff
As of 21 October 2022

Players

Current squad 
The following 29 players have been called up for a training camp at Jakarta and South Korea to prepare for the 2023 FIFA U-20 World Cup.

Caps and goals correct as of 7 March 2023, after the match against .

Recent call-ups 
The following players have also been called up to the squad within the last 12 months.

Notes
PRE = Preliminary squad
SUS = Suspended
INJ = Withdrew from the roster due to an injury
UNF = Withdrew from the roster due to unfit condition
RET = Retired from the national team
WD = Withdrew from the roster for non-injury related reasons

Media coverage 
Indonesia team friendlies are broadcast by Emtek's free-to-air-television network Indosiar (from 2022).

Commercial MNC Media also shows the team but from 2020 until 2024, MNC only covered its matches at the Asian Championship finals tournament due to MNC-Lagardère (through 2020) and DDMC-Fortis (from 2021) broadcasting rights partnership contract. However, Indosiar bought the rights from PSSI only.

Results and fixtures 
International Matches in last 12 months, and future scheduled matches

2022

2023

Tournament record

FIFA U-20 World Cup

AFC U-20 Asian Cup

(*): shared title

AFF U-19 Youth Championship

Exhibition

Honours

Continental

AFC U-20 Asian Cup
Champions (1): 1961
Runners-up: 1967, 1970
Third place: 1962
Fourth place: 1960

Regional
AFF U-19 Youth Championship
Champions (1): 2013
Third place: 2017, 2018, 2019

Exhibition tournaments
HKFA International Youth Football Invitation Tournament
Champions (1): 2013

See also
 Indonesia national football team
 Indonesia national under-23 football team
 Indonesia national under-21 football team
 Indonesia national under-17 football team

References

under-20
Asian national under-20 association football teams